Bronislav Poloczek (7 August 1939 – 16 March 2012) was a Polish-Czech theatre and television actor.

Poloczek was born in Horní Suchá (Sucha Górna). He was best known for his appearances with the Prague National Theatre. He also appeared in various Czech television series, including Ulice and Hospoda; and many films, including Černí baroni. In 2012, he died in Prague, aged 72.

Personal life
Poloczek was a member of the Polish minority in the Czech Republic, always emphasizing his belonging to the Polish nation. In 1956 Poloczek graduated from the Juliusz Słowacki Polish Grammar School. He was married to Zdenka. The couple had a son Bronislav. His wife died in 1995. Poloczek died on 16 March 2012 and was interred at the Olšany Cemetery in Prague.

References

Czech male film actors
Czech male television actors
Czech male stage actors
Polish people from Zaolzie
People from Karviná District
1939 births
2012 deaths
Janáček Academy of Music and Performing Arts alumni
Burials at Olšany Cemetery